Henry S. West Laboratory School is an elementary school in Coral Gables, Florida, United States, on the University of Miami campus and is part of the Miami-Dade County Public Schools system.

Experimental school
The school was established in 1954, as an experimental school of choice associated with the School of Education at the University
of Miami. It collaborates with the University's Department of Teaching and Learning on various projects such as science programs and the creation of a "living habitat". University faculty members and students teach and conduct research throughout the school under the direction of Dr. Shawn Post, as the "Professor in Residence".

Awards
West Laboratory School is graded "A", the highest designation on Florida's six-point assessment scale.

Bales Balbin Bransgrove, a fourth-grader in 2006–07, won several awards for his research on natural and safe alternatives to killing harmful pesticides, including a Student Research Award from Schering-Plough.

Aldeen H. Lindgren, 5th grade teacher, retired, of Palm City Florida,  was recently named "All Time Best Teacher Ever"  by the L.B. Clements Educational Foundation.

References

External links
Official site
Miami-Dade County Public Schools

Miami-Dade County Public Schools
Buildings and structures in Coral Gables, Florida
Educational institutions established in 1954
University-affiliated schools in the United States
Public elementary schools in Florida
1954 establishments in Florida
University of Miami